Adlergrund is a shoal located in the Baltic Sea, at the SW end of the Rönnebank.

The shoal is a protected marine area with an extension of about 234 km2.

Geography
It lies roughly 55 km to the ENE of Cape Arkona, the headland at the northern end of Rügen Island, and 60 km to the SSW of Bornholm. Geographically it is a SW extension of the Rönnebank that runs south of Bornholm.
The submerged shoal's shallowest point is about 5 meters deep at the time of the lowest astronomical tide.

History
Since it comprises large shallow areas dangerous for navigation, Lightship Adlergrund —a lightvessel of the German Hydrographic Office, was anchored on the reef in the period 1884 – 1914 and again in 1922 – 1941.

Currently the construction of two wind farms is planned on the Adlergrund Shoal under the name Wind Energy Network Rostock project.

See also
List of shipwrecks in 1938
Lightvessels

References

External links 
Ostwind 1

Shoals of the Baltic Sea
Geography of Germany